Brand 5 is a range of carbonated flavoured soft drinks that are produced and distributed by the Charles Gaggero Ltd company of Gibraltar until 2019, when production is to cease. Flavours available are raspberry and lemon flavour.

References

External links
 http://www.sacconeandspeedgibraltar.gi/charlesgaggero.html

Gibraltarian drinks
Gibraltarian brands
Gibraltarian culture